Test money (or test notes, test bills, funny money, Monopoly money) are a part of the test apparatus that are often used with currency handling equipment, such as automatic teller machines.  

While it is often desirable to use actual banknotes or coins in the process of testing currency handling equipment, the inherent value of the objects being used means that security procedures must be put in place during the testing period that they are used.  If the testing includes destructive testing, where the currency is purposefully damaged or destroyed to see how the machinery will react, further concern will be raised about the subsequent loss in value of the objects.  To remove these concerns, test money is often used in place of real currency.

Test money may share some or all of the characteristics of a given currency (size, paper type, paper thickness, colouring, printing characteristics, various denominations), but it also has some form of easily identifiable, non-removable, non-mutable characteristics that differentiate it from legal tender, scrip, or counterfeit currency.

For certain types of bulk cash handling equipment, the test money units may represent bundled or rolled currency.

Some members of the notaphiliatelic community collect test money.

Use in television and movies
Test money is often used in television and movie production in the same fashion.

References

External links
A collection of test money from various currency handling device manufacturers
Novčanice za testiranje bankarske opreme (Croatian)

Banking terms
Currency production
Numismatics
Fictional currencies